This is a list of songs that have been number one on the Radio & Records singles chart in the 1980s.

1980

1981

1982

1983

1984

1985

1986

1987

1988

1989

Notes

Sources
 http://wweb.uta.edu/faculty/gghunt/charts/chart.html

Radio
1980s in American music
United States Radio and Records